Emperor Chongzong of Western Xia (1084–1139), born Li Qianshun, was the fourth emperor of the Western Xia dynasty of China, ruling from 1086 to 1139. His reign began at the age of three, when his father Li Bingchang died. He remained under the regency of the Empress Dowager Zhaojian until she was poisoned in 1099 by a Liao envoy.

Li's reign included further sinification and removed the power of some significant Tangut clans, which had remained a powerful political force—appointing tribal leaders as kings, forcing them under his power and influence. His reign saw incursions by the neighboring Liao and Northern Song dynasties, and a series of military defeats from 1114. He established Confucianist-led administration for several political quarters including civil and military, centralising his power. Buddhism was prevalent during his reign, and the scriptures were translated to the Tangut language.

Family 
Consorts and issue:

 Empress, of the Yelü clan (皇后耶律氏), personal name Nanxian (南仙), Princess Cheng'an (成安公主 = )
Crown Prince, Ren'ai (世子仁愛) (1108–1125), first son
 Empress, of the Ren clan (皇后任氏)
 Noble Consort, of the Cao clan (貴妃曹氏) 
Emperor Renzong of Western Xia, Renxiao (西夏仁宗仁孝), second son
 Prince of Yue, Renyou (越王仁友), third son

Notes

References

 
 

1084 births
1139 deaths
Western Xia emperors
11th-century Chinese monarchs
12th-century Chinese monarchs
12th-century Tangut rulers
11th-century Tangut rulers